Gladys Hamer (27 May 1884 – 13 March 1967) was a British stage and film actress. She appeared in a number of silent and early sound films.

Selected filmography
 Mary-Find-the-Gold (1921)
 Monty Works the Wires (1921)
 The Rest Cure (1923)
 This Freedom (1923)
 Not for Sale (1924)
 His Grace Gives Notice (1924)
 Money Isn't Everything (1925)
The Gold Cure (1925)
 Confessions (1925)
 Every Mother's Son (1926)
 The Magician (1926)
 Passion Island (1927)
 Sailors Don't Care (1928)
 Smashing Through (1929)
 Alf's Carpet (1929)
 Kissing Cup's Race (1930)
 Lord Richard in the Pantry (1930)
 Number, Please (1931)
 Sunshine Susie (1931)
 Double Dealing (1932)
 Great Stuff (1933)
 Easy Money (1934)
 Three Witnesses (1935)
 That's My Uncle (1935)

Bibliography
 Low, Rachael. History of the British Film, 1918–1929. George Allen & Unwin, 1971.

External links

1884 births
1967 deaths
British film actresses
British stage actresses
20th-century British actresses
British actresses